"Touchin' On My" is the first promotional single and the third single released from 3OH!3's third album Streets of Gold. It was released as a digital download on 18 May 2010 and was released as a single on January 20, 2011.

Critical reception
David Jeffries of AllMusic referred to the song as "cute", positively commenting on the use of "a censor’s bleep into its synth pop melody". Emily Mackay of NME criticized the song, commenting that "There’s no lamer sound in ‘offensive’ pop than the blarts in 'Touchin’ On My’: 'Touchin’ on my BLART/While I’m touching on your BLART'". Jody Rosen of Rolling Stone stated that "The formula is the same: dopey electro rock bolstering "raps" about drinking ("Wake up next to pharaohs hung over in Cairo") and getting girls to "touch on" their privates", in reference to "I Know How to Say" and "Touchin' on My" respectively.

Chart performance
In the United States, "Touchin' on My" debuted and peaked at number 49 on the Billboard Hot 100 chart for the issue dated June 5, 2010. The song dropped to number 89 the following week, spending a total of two weeks on the chart. In Canada, the song also spent two weeks on the Canadian Hot 100 chart, having debuted and peaked at number 22 for the issue dated June 5, 2010.

Music video
The video was filmed by director Isaac Ravishankara in December 2010. The video premiered on January 20, 2011. The music video starts with a man walking in his underwear out into the street and 3OH!3 runs the man over in their car. The music video is framed around Sean Foreman and Nathaniel Motte walking around different scenes rapping into the camera. To fit the theme of the song, some faces, scenes, body parts, etc. are blurred out. One scene includes 3OH!3 walking into a room where an evidently pornographic scene is being filmed. Everything in those following scenes are blurred out. The ending of the video involves someone giving Motte an 'F-bomb' and Foreman fighting over a bomb that is about to explode. They don't drop the bomb, this is a reference to how in the song "Touchin on My" the duo didn't drop the 'F-bomb' though it was implied throughout the song. Foreman gives Motte the bomb and runs and leave Motte alone, and the video fades to black as it explodes to Motte.

Charts

References

2010 songs
2011 singles
3OH!3 songs
Songs written by Nathaniel Motte
Songs written by Sean Foreman
Photo Finish Records singles